SV 1919 Bernbach is a German association football club in Bernbach, a village in Freigericht, Hesse.

History
The club was founded in the autumn of 1919 as Fußballclub Germania Bernbach. The club suspended its activities with the onset of World War II and after the conflict was re-established as Sportgemeinde Bernbach out of which came Sportverein 1919 Bernbach in 1954.

After many years in lower-tier football the team first ascended to the Landesliga Hessen-Süd (V) in 1990 on the strength of a Berzirksliga Frankfurt/Ost championship. They finished in second place in their debut Landesliga season and the capture of a division title in 1995 advanced the club to the Oberliga Hessen (IV). Bernbach earned a vice-championship there in 1998 and took part in promotion playoff for the Regionalliga Süd (III), but missed advancing when they finished second to SC Pfullendorf.

The club soon ran into financial difficulty and by 2001 were facing bankruptcy. They were initially refused a license for Oberliga play and faced relegation, but after long negotiation and the adoption of a tight budget were able to stay up. Bernbach was eventually relegated after a poor result in 2005, and has since become an elevator club moving frequently between fourth and fifth tier competition. After re-claiming a place in the Oberliga in 2006–07, SV finished in 14th place and were again relegated to play in the Landesliga Hessen (V). In the following years, the club suffered a decline which has put it into the Kreisoberliga (VIII) for 2011–12.

SV Bernbach is notable as having been one of the ten smallest clubs in the country playing at the Oberliga level.

Honours
The club's honours:

League
 Landesliga Hessen-Süd
 Champions: 1995, 2006
 Runners-up: 1991
 Bezirksoberliga Frankfurt/Ost
 Champions: 1990

Cup
 Hesse Cup
 Runners-up: 2004

Recent seasons
The recent season-by-season performance of the club:

 With the introduction of the Regionalligas in 1994 and the 3. Liga in 2008 as the new third tier, below the 2. Bundesliga, all leagues below dropped one tier. Also in 2008, a large number of football leagues in Hesse were renamed, with the Oberliga Hessen becoming the Hessenliga, the Landesliga becoming the Verbandsliga, the Bezirksoberliga becoming the Gruppenliga and the Bezirksliga becoming the Kreisoberliga.

References

External links
 Official team site
 Das deutsche Fußball-Archiv  historical German domestic league tables

Football clubs in Germany
Football clubs in Hesse
Association football clubs established in 1919
1919 establishments in Germany